Baldr, Balder or Baldur is a Norse god.

Balder or Baldr may also refer to:

People 
 Balder (surname)
 Balder Tomasberg (1897–1919), Estonian artist

Places 
 Balderfonna, a glacier in Svalbard, Norway
 Balder Formation, a geological formation in the North Sea off Great Britain
 Balder Point, a headland in Antarctica
 Mount Baldr, Baffin Island, Canada
 River Balder, in County Durham, England

Plants 
 Polistes balder, a species of paper wasp
 Ulmus × hollandica 'Balder', an elm cultivar

Vehicles 
 Balder (roller coaster), in Sweden
 Balder Viking or CCGS Jean Goodwill, an icebreaking anchor handling tug supply vessel converted to a medium class icebreaker
 DCV Balder, a 1978 deepwater construction vessel
 MS Balder Sten or MS Phocine, a ferry built in 1985

Fiction 
 Balder (character), a Marvel Comics character
 Baldr video game series, including Baldr Force, Baldr Bullet and Baldr Sky
 Baldur, a character in the 2018 video game God of War

See also
Baldur (disambiguation)
Baldur (given name), the origin of the name